Tommy Sugiarto (born 31 May 1988) is an Indonesian badminton player who is a singles specialist. He was the bronze medalist at the 2014 World Championships. Sugiarto competed at the 2014 Asian Games and 2016 Summer Olympics.

Personal life 
Tommy Sugiarto is the son of the former badminton world champion Icuk Sugiarto. He has also a younger sister named Jauza Fadhila Sugiarto (born 1999) who is also a badminton player and represented Indonesia in the 2014 BWF World Junior Championships. In December 2016, he married Annisa Nur Ramadhani.

Career

2023 
In January, Tommy Sugiarto played at the home tournament, Indonesia Masters, but had to lose in the first qualifying round from Danish player Victor Svendsen. In the next tournament, he lost in the first round of the Thailand Masters from fellow Indonesian player Christian Adinata in rubber games.

Achievements

BWF World Championships 
Men's singles

World University Championships 
Men's singles

World Junior Championships 
Boys' singles

BWF World Tour (1 title, 2 runners-up) 
The BWF World Tour, which was announced on 19 March 2017 and implemented in 2018, is a series of elite badminton tournaments sanctioned by the Badminton World Federation (BWF). The BWF World Tour is divided into levels of World Tour Finals, Super 1000, Super 750, Super 500, Super 300 (part of the HSBC World Tour), and the BWF Tour Super 100.

Men's singles

BWF Superseries (1 title, 3 runners-up) 
The BWF Superseries, which was launched on 14 December 2006 and implemented in 2007, was a series of elite badminton tournaments, sanctioned by the Badminton World Federation (BWF). BWF Superseries levels were Superseries and Superseries Premier. A season of Superseries consisted of twelve tournaments around the world that had been introduced since 2011. Successful players were invited to the Superseries Finals, which were held at the end of each year.

Men's singles

  Superseries Finals tournament
  Superseries Premier tournament
  Superseries tournament

BWF Grand Prix (5 titles, 2 runners-up) 
The BWF Grand Prix had two levels, the Grand Prix and Grand Prix Gold. It was a series of badminton tournaments sanctioned by the Badminton World Federation (BWF) and played between 2007 and 2017.

Men's singles

  BWF Grand Prix Gold tournament
  BWF Grand Prix tournament

BWF International Challenge/Satellite/Series (7 titles, 1 runner-up) 

Men's singles

  BWF International Challenge tournament
  BWF International Series tournament

Performance timeline

National team 
 Junior level

 Senior level

Individual competitions 
 Junior level

 Senior level

Record against selected opponents 
Head to head (H2H) against World Superseries finalists, World Championships semifinalists, and Olympic quarterfinalists.

  Chen Jin 0–5
  Chen Long 1–12
  Chen Yu 0–2
  Lin Dan 2–6
  Shi Yuqi 1–2
  Tian Houwei 1–4
  Anders Antonsen 0–1
  Hans-Kristian Vittinghus 4–1
  Jan Ø. Jørgensen 1–3
  Peter Gade 0–3
  Viktor Axelsen 2–5
  Anthony Ginting 3–3
  Sony Dwi Kuncoro 2–3
  Taufik Hidayat 1–2
  Parupalli Kashyap 4–4
  Sai Praneeth 2–3
  Srikanth Kidambi 3–3
  Kento Momota 3–9
  Sho Sasaki 3–2
  Heo Kwang-hee 1–1
  Lee Hyun-il 3–3
  Son Wan-ho 2–7
  Lee Chong Wei 0–17
  Liew Daren '''3–1
  Wong Choong Hann 0–4
  Boonsak Ponsana '5–2
  Chou Tien-chen 5–5
  Nguyễn Tiến Minh ''1–6

References

External links 

 
 
 

1988 births
Living people
Sportspeople from Jakarta
Indonesian male badminton players
Badminton players at the 2016 Summer Olympics
Olympic badminton players of Indonesia
Badminton players at the 2014 Asian Games
Asian Games competitors for Indonesia
Competitors at the 2009 Southeast Asian Games
Competitors at the 2011 Southeast Asian Games
Southeast Asian Games gold medalists for Indonesia
Southeast Asian Games medalists in badminton
Universiade bronze medalists for Indonesia
Universiade medalists in badminton
Medalists at the 2007 Summer Universiade
21st-century Indonesian people